Prakash Keshav Javadekar (born 30 January 1951)  is an Indian politician. He is a member of the Bharatiya Janata Party (BJP) and served as the Minister of Environment, Forest and Climate Change from 30 May 2019 till 7 July 2021.

Javadekar was elected to the upper house Rajya Sabha as a Member of Parliament from Maharashtra in 2008, and re-elected from Madhya Pradesh in 2014.

Following the victory of the Bharatiya Janata Party in the 2014 Indian General Election, he was appointed Minister State (Independent Charge) for Environment, Forests and Climate Change by Prime Minister Narendra Modi. He is also a Minister of State for Parliamentary Affairs, and briefly held the portfolio of Information and Broadcasting.

Javadekar is an official spokesperson of the BJP.

He is married to Prachee Javadekar and has two sons. He also has a brother, Suhas Javadekar.

Education 
Javadekar has a B.Com.(Hons) from the University of Pune.

Political career 

Active in politics since his college days, Javadekar was a member of ABVP, the student union. During the Emergency declared by Prime Minister Indira Gandhi between 1975 and 1977, Javadekar participated in student movements against the government.

From 1984 to 1990, Javadekar was a National Secretary and then General Secretary in the Bharatiya Janata Yuva Morcha. In 1989, he was appointed State Secretary and Campaign Chief of the Bharatiya Janata Party in Maharashtra, a position he held till 1995. Javadekar was elected to the Maharashtra Legislative Council between 1990 and 2002. He also occupied the positions of the Executive President of the State Planning Board and then Chairman of the Task Force on IT in the Government of Maharashtra.

In 2008, Javadekar was elected to the Rajya Sabha as a Member of Parliament from Maharashtra. He was re-elected from Madhya Pradesh in 2014.

Following the victory of the Bharatiya Janata Party in the 2014 Indian General Election, Javadekar was appointed Minister State (Independent Charge) for Environment, Forests and Climate Change by Prime Minister Narendra Modi. He was also appointed as a Minister of State for Parliamentary Affairs. He led the Indian delegation to the 2015 United Nations Climate Change Conference.

Between May to November 2014, he was also Minister of State for Information and Broadcasting. After taking charge of his ministry, Javadekar notably said that “the media itself suffices for self-regulation. Institutions are important for the functioning of democracy and priorities would be worked out after due consultation with the stakeholders”.

Javadekar is now the Human Resource and Development Minister of India and also a veteran spokesperson of the Bharatiya Janata Party. Before becoming a National Spokesperson, he was also a Spokesperson for the Maharashtra BJP. He has also previously in-charge of the BJP's Economic Forum and Cells related to the economy.

On 31 May 2012, based on Javadekar's complaints about various irregularities in coal mining, the Central Vigilance Commission (CVC) directed a CBI enquiry. He said,"We have made a formal complaint to CVC because there were so many glaring lacunae which needed to be probed. If the inquiry has been ordered, it's good."

Javdekar's ministry conducts a common admission process for national institutes via the Joint Seat Allocation Authority. In 2016 more than 3000 seats were still vacant in the 92 institutes involved in the system, leading to calls for a further round of placements to fill the vacancies. To date the ministry has refused to conduct a "spot round" of further placements.

In May 2019, Javadekar became the Cabinet Minister for Environment, Forest and Climate Change and Information and Broadcasting.

In July 2021, he was removed from all posts of cabinet ministers in Government of India.

Personal life 
Javadekar's wife Prachee Javadekar is an education researcher and consultant and is a former Director of Indira Institute of Management, Pune. He has two sons: Ashutosh Javadekar who is a dentist and an artist, and Apoorva Javadekar, who is Assistant Professor of Finance at Indian School of Business. On 16 April 2021, he tested positive for COVID-19.

Positions held 

Union Minister of Human Resource Development - {5 July 2016 to 30 May 2019}
 Union Minister of State (Independent Charge) for Environment, Forests, and Climate Change portfolio.
Member of Parliament, Rajya Sabha (UP) as a candidate from BJP
 October 2011 onwards - Member, Committee on the Implementation of the Right to Education Act
 Union Minister of State (Independent Charge) for Information and Broadcasting (May 2014 - November 2014)
 Union Minister of State for Parliamentary Affairs (May 2014 - November 2014)
Member of Parliament, Rajya Sabha (Maharashtra) (2008–14)
 Member, Standing Committee on Defence (2008–10 and 2012–14)
 Member, Press Council of India (2010–14)
 Member, Standing Committee on Human Resources and Development (2010–12)
 Member, Public Accounts Committee
 Member, Consultative Committee for Ministry of Power
 Member, Committee on Subordinate Legislation
 Member, Committee on Waqf
 Chairman, Working Group on "IT for Masses", Government of India. (2000)
 President, NOINO (National Organization of Insurance Officers)
 President, KCKU (Khadi Commission Karmachari Union)
 Executive President, State Planning Board Maharashtra (1995-1999)
 Member of Legislative Council – Maharashtra from the Pune Division Graduate Constituency (1990-2002)
 Chairman, TASK FORCE ON IT, Government of Maharashtra (1997-1999)
 President, GLOBE India (Global Legislators Organisation for Balanced Environment)

Books published 
In Marathi:
 (i) Bekaricha Jwalamukhi (Problem of Unemployment), 1986, 
 (ii) Nanenidhiche Karz (IMF Loan), 1987
 (iii) Shetkaryanchi Karzmukti (Farm Loan Waiver), 1988 
 (iv) Mahagaicha Bhasmasoor (Problem of Inflation), 1999 and 2010
 Presented over 300 articles in various newspapers on contemporary subjects; has also written many booklets on unemployment, inflation, IMF loan and other political issues

References

External links 

 Official website
 Detailed Profile: Shri Prakash Javadekar
 Prakash Javadekar on Facebook
 Prakash Javdekar on Twitter

|-

|-

|-

|-

|-

|-

1951 births
Living people
Bharatiya Janata Party politicians from Maharashtra
Members of the Maharashtra Legislative Council
Marathi politicians
Politicians from Pune
Rajya Sabha members from Maharashtra
Indians imprisoned during the Emergency (India)
Rajya Sabha members from Madhya Pradesh
Savitribai Phule Pune University alumni
Narendra Modi ministry
Ministers for Information and Broadcasting of India
Members of the Cabinet of India
Education Ministers of India
Rajya Sabha members from the Bharatiya Janata Party